Reflection Riding Arboretum and Nature Center (317 acres) is a nonprofit arboretum, botanical garden, nature center and historical site located at 400 Garden Road, Chattanooga, Tennessee.

The facility includes the 317-acre arboretum, 15 miles of trails, live animals indoor and outdoors, and a treehouse. The nature center participates in the endangered Red Wolf Species Survival Plan or SSP, breeding red wolves in captivity.

The riding was created by John and Margaret Chambliss, and incorporated in 1956 to a vision laid out in the 1940s. It is dedicated to the study and conservation of native plant life.

The riding contains over 1,000 species of flora, with over 150 tree species.

History

In 2011, the formerly separate Reflection Riding Arboretum and the Chattanooga Nature Center combined boards and management.  The new organization was originally called the Chattanooga Arboretum and Nature Center. In October 2017 the nonprofit hired RootsRated co-founder Mark McKnight as President. In March, 2018 they announced the creation of a new Forest Kindergarten and Forest School. The organization has been a member of the red wolf species survival plan and captive breeding program since 1996 and has been an advocate for the program through educational outreach and programming.

See also 
 List of botanical gardens in the United States
 List of nature centers in Tennessee
 List of nature centers

References

External links 
 Reflection Riding Arboretum and Botanical Garden
 iNaturalist observations of plants and animals on the property
 John A. Chambliss on the Creation of Reflection Riding

Arboreta in Tennessee
Botanical gardens in Tennessee
Geography of Chattanooga, Tennessee
Protected areas of Hamilton County, Tennessee
Tourist attractions in Chattanooga, Tennessee
Nature centers in Tennessee